Geoff Jansz (born 1958 ) is a Sri Lankan-born Australian chef and television presenter.

Career 
After graduating from the University of Sydney with a Bachelor of Pharmacy in 1984, Geoff Jansz worked as a pharmacist, but later opened a restaurant in Picton, New South Wales. His first television appearance was as a food presenter on EveryBody in 1992 with the Australian Broadcasting Corporation, an early programme in the lifestyle genre. Jansz's first notable television role came later in 1992 as a presenter on the Nine Network's What's Cooking, which he hosted from 1993 until its conclusion in 1999. In 1995 he débuted on the Burke's Backyard, in which he made a guest appearance, then presented a regular weekly segment until its end in 2004. He also hosted the daytime cooking programme Fresh with the Australian Women's Weekly.

Jansz was a regular contributor to the Australian Gourmet Traveller between 1987 and 1992 and has written three books: Taking The Freshest Approach, Favourite Recipes and Geoff Jansz Desserts.

In 2007, Jansz was a Host Chef at the Great Barrier Feast Culinary Masterclass event on Hamilton Island which was hosted by Curtis Stone and featured other notable Australian chefs, Shannon Bennett, Justin North.

External links
All about Geoff Jansz

References
 

1958 births
Australian television presenters
Australian television chefs
Living people
Australian people of Sri Lankan descent
Australian people of Dutch descent
University of Sydney alumni
Australian pharmacists